Kambar or Kavichakravarthy Kamban (1180 CE–1250 CE) was an Indian Tamil poet and the author of the Ramavataram, popularly known as Kambaramayanam, the Tamil version of the epic Ramayana. Kambar also authored other literary works in Tamil, such as Thirukkai Vazhakkam, Erezhupathu, Silaiyezhupathu, Kangai Puranam, Sadagopar Anthathi and Saraswati Anthathi.

Life
Kambar was born in Therazhundur. His father was a wealthy farmer named Sadaiyepa Vallal. He grew up the Chola Empire under the reign of Kulothunga III. Having heard of this talented bard, Kulothunga summoned him to his court and honoured him with the title Kavi Chakravarty (The Emperor of Poets).

Kambar flourished in Therazhundur, a village in the culturally rich Nagapattinam District in the modern state of Tamil Nadu in South India.

Kambar is generally dated after the vaishnavite philosopher, Ramanuja, as the poet refers to the latter in his work, the Sadagopar Andhadhi.

Kamban was a great scholar of both Tamil and Sanskrit—two of India's oldest and richest languages in terms of literary works. In a scholarly biography, Kavichakravarty Kamban, Mahavidwan R. Raghava Iyengar wrote in detail about Kambar.

Kambar spent his last days in Nattarasankottai (known for Kannathal temple) near to Sivagangai town and his tomb is situated there. It is said that Kambar after having differences with Kulothunga's son, Rajaraja III, he left the Chola kingdom and moved from place to place. When he reached at Nattarasankottai, he was very thirsty and asked water in one house at Nattarasankottai. He was offered buttermilk in return and he became very happy and decided to stay there itself and spent his last days there. He lived there till his death. There is tomb in Nattarasankottai and every year a celebration called Kamban vizha is conducted at this place to felicitate Kambar.

Literary works

 Kamba Ramayanam (also called Ramavataram) - Retelling of the Indian epic Ramayana in Tamil. Work covers 11,000 stanzas. 
 Saraswati Andhadhi - Literary work of style Andhadhi in praise of Hindu Goddess Saraswati
 Sadagopar Andhadhi - Literary work of style Andhadhi in praise of Vaishnava Saint Nammalvar
 Silaiezhupathu - Work in praise of 11th century Pallava king Karunakara Tondaiman 
 Thirukkai Vazhakkam
 Erezhupathu
 Kangai Puranam
 Mangala Vazhthu, a lengthy song composed by Kambar, is usually sung on the wedding ceremony of Kongu Vellalar community. In that wedding ceremony, the brother of the bride and sister of the groom play significant roles.

Kamba Ramayanam

The original version of Ramayana was written by Valmiki. It is an epic of 24,000 verses which depicts the journey of Rama, a prince of Ayodhya who belonged to Raghuvamsa (Solar dynasty). In Hinduism, Rama is the seventh incarnation of Lord Vishnu, one of the Trimurti (the Hindu holy trinity which includes Brahma and Shiva).

The Ramavataram or Kamba Ramayanam of Kamban is an epic of about 11,000 stanzas. The Rama-avataram or Rama-kathai as it was originally called was accepted into the holy precincts in the presence of Vaishnava Acharya Naathamuni.

Kamba Ramayana is not a verbal translation of the Sanskrit epic by Valmiki, but a retelling of the story of Lord Rama.

Legend has it that the entire episode was written in one night by Lord Ganesh. Ganesha is said to have written the poems that Kambar dictated to him during the night, as Kambar procrastinated the work till the day before the deadline set by the King.

Kamba Ramayana was first delivered in Sri Ranganathaswamy Temple, Srirangam at the court hall (Kambar Arangetra Mandapam) near Thaayar sannithi.

Legend says that when contemporaries objected to Hiranyavadaipadalam ("Story of Hiranyakasipu", which occurs as Vibhishana telling Ravana while warning against his false sense of invincibility), Kamban read it in front of the Narasimha Swami temple in Sri Ranganathaswamy Temple. The Swami applauded by laughing out aloud from his Sanctum Sanctora (Mettu Narasimhar Sannidhi), and this was taken as proof of approval.

Kambar's praise

Many Tamil poets, statesmen, kings, and common people have praised Kambar for his Kambaramayanam, which has more than 10,000 songs and 45,000 lines, forming one of the greatest of Tamil epics.

A common word of praise attributed to Kambar is that even the mill in his house would sing ("Kambar veettuk kattuththariyum kavipadum"; "கம்பர் வீட்டுக் கட்டுத்தறியும் 
கவி பாடும்"). He is considered special in singing poems under "Viruthapa".

"Kamba Sutram" (கம்ப சூத்திரம்) is a phrase used by Tamil people in their day-to-day activity. It was originally "Kamba Chithiram", denoting Kamban's art. However, over a period of time, it came to be rendered as "Kamba Sutram". The phrase is used just like "rocket science", which clearly denotes that skills of Kambar in writing poem with viruthapa is as difficult as "rocket science".

References

Tamil poets
Indian male poets
Hindu poets
12th-century Indian poets
Poets from Tamil Nadu
People from Thanjavur district
Translators of the Ramayana
1180 births
1250 deaths